Juan Anangonó may refer to:
Juan Carlos Anangonó (born 1989), Ecuadorian footballer
Juan Luis Anangonó (born 1989), Ecuadorian international footballer